The surname Benenson may refer to:

Abram Salmon Benenson (1914–2003), American public health physician
Charles Benenson (1913–2004), American real estate broker
Emily Benenson (born 1957), American figure skater
Fira Benenson (1898–1977), Russian-born American fashion designer
Flora Solomon (née Benenson), (1895–1984) Russian-born British social activist
Grigori Benenson (1860–1939), Jewish Russian financier 
Joel Benenson (born 1952), American pollster and consultant 
Manya Harari (née Benenson), (1905–1969) Russian-born British translator of Doctor Zhivago
Peter Benenson (1921–2005), English lawyer and founder of Amnesty International